Steve Hayes is a retired American professional soccer player and college coach.  He played professionally in the American Professional Soccer League and National Professional Soccer League.  He spent his entire coaching career at Oral Roberts University.

Player
Hayes graduated from Memorial High School.  He attended George Mason University, playing on the men's soccer team from 1986 to 1989.  In the summer of 1989, Hayes played for the Tulsa Renegades in the Southwest Outdoor Soccer League.  He tied for the top of the season assist list.  In 1990, Hayes moved to the Washington Stars of the American Professional Soccer League.  He finished his professional career with the Tulsa Ambush during the 1991–1992 National Professional Soccer League season.

Coach
In 1992, Hayes entered the coaching ranks as an assistant with the Oral Roberts University men's soccer team.  In 1994, he moved up to become the head coach of the Oral Roberts women's team.  In 1998, Hayes switched to the men's team, coaching it until 2012.  Resigned after the 2012 season.

References

External links
 ORU Golden Eagles: Steve Hayes

Living people
1959 births
American soccer players
American soccer coaches
American Professional Soccer League players
George Mason Patriots men's soccer players
National Professional Soccer League (1984–2001) players
USISL players
Tulsa Ambush players
Tulsa Renegades players
Washington Stars players
Association football midfielders
Oral Roberts Golden Eagles men's soccer coaches
Oral Roberts Golden Eagles women's soccer coaches